Chicoreus jessicae is a species of sea snail, a marine gastropod mollusk in the family Muricidae, the murex snails or rock snails.

Description

Distribution
This marine species occurs off the Philippines.

References

 Houart, R. (2008). Description of a new species of Chicoreus (Triplex) Perry, 1811 (Gastropoda: Muricidae) from Palawan, Philippine Islands. Novapex (Jodoigne), 9(4): 165-170

Muricidae
Gastropods described in 2008